An Act to amend the Criminal Code (minimum sentence for offences involving trafficking of persons under the age of eighteen years) (the Act) was a private member's bill that was enacted on June 29, 2010, by the 40th Canadian Parliament. Until that time, no other private member's bill had passed since the 2008 Canadian federal election. The bill that led to the Act, Bill C-268, was sponsored by Joy Smith, Member of Parliament for Kildonan—St. Paul. The act established a mandatory sentencing of five years' imprisonment for those charged with the trafficking of children within Canada.

Before the bill was passed, there was already a maximum sentence for trafficking children in the country, but there was no minimum sentence. A previous attempt to have the bill passed had failed because of prorogation. At the first and second readings, the Bloc Québécois was the only political party that opposed the bill.

Anti-pornography activist Judy Nuttall had tried to get the bill passed before the 2010 Winter Olympics; she said that poor children commonly become sexual slaves at internationally attended events such as the Olympic Games. Assembly of Manitoba Chiefs Grand Chief Ron Evans also supported the bill before it was passed, saying, "Bill C-268 is one step forward for the First Nations women and children of Canada."

References

Human trafficking in Canada
Canadian federal legislation
40th Canadian Parliament
2010 in Canadian politics
Canadian criminal law
Conservative Party of Canada
Crimes against children
Child prostitution
Sentencing (law)
Child abduction in Canada
Sex crimes in Canada
Violence against Indigenous women in Canada
2010 in Canadian law